Cavalry (Italian: Cavalleria) is a 1936 Italian drama film directed by Goffredo Alessandrini and starring Amedeo Nazzari, Elisa Cegani and Luigi Carini. The film marked Nazzari's first role as a lead actor, after making his film debut the previous year. It was a box office success and established some of his personal traits that would be brought out even more clearly in his breakthrough role Luciano Serra, Pilot (1938).

Synopsis
Umberto Solaro, a young cavalry officer, falls in love with a Piedmont Count's daughter. They develop a romantic attachment, but she marries an Austrian baron under family pressure. After his horse dies in an accident during a completion, Solaro transfers into the newly formed Italian Air Force. He falls heroically in combat during the First World War.

Cast
 Amedeo Nazzari as Umberto Solaro 
 Elisa Cegani as Speranza di Frassineto 
 Luigi Carini as Speranza's father 
 Mario Ferrari as Alberto Ponza 
 Enrico Viarisio as Sottotenente Rolla 
 Clara Padoa as Countess Clotilde, Speranza's mother 
 Silvana Jachino as Carlotta di Frasseneto 
 Adolfo Geri as Vittorio di Frasseneto 
 Ernst Nadherny as Baron of Austria 
 Anna Magnani as Fanny
 Nora D'Alba as Countess Sandi 
 Silvio Bagolini as Attendant Bagolini 
 Fausto Guerzoni as Other Attendant 
 Oreste Fares as The Doctor 
 Umberto Casilini as Member of the Union Circle 
 Walter Grant as Superior Official 
 Cecyl Tryan as Lady of Torino's Aristocracy 
 Michele Malaspina as Cavalry Officer 
 Albino Principe as Carlotta's Husband 
 Rosina Adrario as Countess Adrari

References

Bibliography 
Gundle, Stephen. Mussolini's Dream Factory: Film Stardom in Fascist Italy. Berghahn Books, 2013.

External links 

1936 films
1936 drama films
Italian drama films
1930s Italian-language films
Films directed by Goffredo Alessandrini
Italian black-and-white films
Films set in Italy
Films set in the 1900s
Films set in the 1910s
World War I aviation films
Films about horses
Lux Film films
Films scored by Enzo Masetti
World War I films set on the Italian Front
1930s Italian films